Bakersville is a town in Mitchell County, North Carolina, United States. The population was 464 at the 2010 census. It is the county seat of Mitchell County.

History
In prehistoric times, local mica deposits were extensively mined by Native Americans. The first Euro-American settlers arrived in the area after the American Revolution, establishing scattered homesteads. The town of Bakersville dates from the 1850s and was named for David Baker, a Revolutionary War soldier and one of the first to live in the area around 1790 and described as "a large land owner, innkeeper, merchant and political leader until his death in 1838. Some of David's sons and daughters remained and were equally influential in the area for many years after David's death. " Situated on the main route leading over Roan Mountain and westward into Tennessee, the town developed slowly. Traveler Frederick Law Olmsted passed through Bakersville in the early 1850s and noted that the "town" consisted of only a couple of cabins within a quarter-mile radius. In 1861, a post office was established and named Davis after Jefferson Davis. Following the Civil War, the county seat of newly created Mitchell County was relocated to the town that had been renamed Bakersville by the Republican state government, leading to the construction of a courthouse and a growth in population. In the 1870s, as mica became commercially valuable, the rich local deposits of the mineral caused a temporary economic boom. Bakersville is also home to the North Carolina Rhododendron Festival.  The pageant attracts visitors from across the state and nation, most notably Richard Nixon in 1968.

Historian and sociologist James W. Loewen has identified Bakersville as one of several possible sundown towns in North Carolina.

The Mitchell County Courthouse was added to the National Register of Historic Places in 1979.

Geography
Bakersville is located at  (36.014002, -82.155695).

Education
 
Bakersville has one public primary and middle school, with approximately two hundred students.

Demographics

As of the census of 2000, there were 357 people, 168 households, and 97 families residing in the town. The population density was 474.4 people per square mile (183.8/km2). There were 206 housing units at an average density of 273.8 per square mile (106.0/km2). The racial makeup of the town was 99.72% White and 0.28% Native American. Hispanic or Latino of any race were 0.28% of the population.

There were 168 households, out of which 20.2% had children under the age of 18 living with them, 45.2% were married couples living together, 12.5% had a female householder with no husband present, and 41.7% were non-families. 39.3% of all households were made up of individuals, and 22.6% had someone living alone who was 65 years of age or older. The average household size was 2.04 and the average family size was 2.72.

In the town, the population was spread out, with 19.3% under the age of 18, 8.1% from 18 to 24, 20.4% from 25 to 44, 26.1% from 45 to 64, and 26.1% who were 65 years of age or older. The median age was 46 years. For every 100 females, there were 77.6 males. For every 100 females age 18 and over, there were 76.7 males.

The median income for a household in the town was $19,286, and the median income for a family was $31,563. Males had a median income of $27,500 versus $22,083 for females. The per capita income for the town was $15,997. About 15.2% of families and 18.2% of the population were below the poverty line, including 16.9% of those under age 18 and 23.7% of those age 65 or over.

Educational facilities 
Bakersville is home to Gouge Primary School (K–4), Bowman Middle School (5–8), and Mitchell High School (9-12).

The Mitchell County Library, a branch of the Avery-Mitchell-Yancey Regional Library, is located at 18 North Mitchell Avenue.

Notable people 
 Del McCoury, bluegrass musician
 Red Wilson, bluegrass musician
 Waddell Wilson, former crew chief and engine builder in NASCAR
 Ralph Yelton, served in the Tennessee House of Representatives from 1977 to 1989

See also
 Banner Elk, North Carolina
 Eastern Continental Divide
 Elizabethton, Tennessee
 Roan Mountain, Tennessee
 Roan Mountain State Park - Roan Mountain, Tennessee
 Roan Mountain (Roan Highlands)

References

Towns in Mitchell County, North Carolina
Towns in North Carolina
County seats in North Carolina